Narosura is a settlement in Kenya's Narok County in Narok South district approximately 42 miles south of Narok Town. The people living around Narosura are predominantly pastoralist Maasai, some of whom also practice irrigation agriculture.

Narosura has come to be known as a hub of commerce and horticulture. Narosura also boasts a large concentration of university graduates complemented by a large number of skilled professionals in Maasailand. Important community institutions include a public-run health center, several churches and schools.

Geography

People

Economy
Though located in the backwaters of predominantly semi-arid plains at the foot of the Loita hills, Narosurra Town is a fairly modern and fast growing commercial hub.

Education
While Narosura has remained for decades without a high school, it is probable that it has the largest concentration of post-secondary educated residents. Until the establishment of Kuntai Primary School, the only primary school that offered primary school education to local children was Kanunka Primary School on the foot of the Loita Mountain range, about seven miles to the due south of Narosura Town.

Archaeology 
Archaeologists discovered an important Pastoral Neolithic site at Narosura in the early 1970s. The site was occupied by a Savanna Pastoral Neolithic pastoralist community c.3000-2000 BP. Narosura now serves as the type site for "Narosura Ware" ceramics, a distinctive style of pottery characterized by open bowls with comb-stamped decorations in bands near rims.

References 

Populated places in Narok County